Jacob Shaw's Regiment was a first Russian regular infantry regiment of the Russian Army. The regiments of the new order, or regiments of the foreign order ("" or ""), was the Russian term that was used to describe military units that were formed in the Tsardom of Russia and Russian Empire in the 17th century according to the Western European military standards composed of Mercenary officers and soldiers of Russian origin. Some number of soldiers and officers from Jacob Shaw's Regiment later participated in the New Russian Army reform that was done in cooperation with general Alexander Leslie with Boyar Boris Morozov.

History

Formation

During the Polish–Russian War (1605–18) a Regiment under the command of William Grim, later under captain-Rittmeister Jacob Shaw, (both Scots) was in the service of the Polish–Lithuanian Commonwealth. In August 1613 a Russian army commanded by Voevoda Dmitrii M. Cherkasskii laid siege to the Bely fortress. After putting up a stout defence for almost a month, the garrison switched sides, surrendered the fortress and took service with Russia's military force. Voevoda Cherkasski was impressed by the garrison's skill and determination, and he reported that to Moscow. The , as the Russians called them, consisted of excellent, well-ordered soldiers with highly competent officers, it was raised in Scotland and another company was raised in Ireland

Campaigns

In 1618 at least eighteen former members of the Belaia garrison served in military forces defending Moscow against a Polish army that contained many Irish and Scottish troops. At least six of them, including George Learmonth, helped decisively turn back Prince Wladyslaw's troops in intense fighting at Moscow's Arbat Gates of Bely Gorod. In that battle, Ensign George Learmonth's bravery was on display ‘for all to see’. When Lieutenant David Edwards was killed in the defence of Moscow, the Irish soldiers in his company immediately petitioned to have George Learmonth replace him. Newly promoted Lieutenant Yuri Lermont received fifteen rubles per month.

The regiment participated in several Russo-Crimean Wars against the Crimean–Nogai raids. Since year 1626 all foreign mercenaries starts to be written under the Russian names, and after converting to Orthodox Christianity they always received certain material benefits (typically lands with serfs or rubles and clothes).

After 1629 was quickly disbanded, part of soldiers moved to Sweden, part continue their service under command of Alexander Leslie of Auchintoul, later Patrick Gordon of Auchleuchries. Some of them join first
Moscouvite Reiters regiment of Charles d'Ebert, like major/"ожидант" Petr Clelland/Петр Клилянт.

1st Platoon
Captain William Grim/Вилим Грим
Captain-Rittmeister Jacob-James Shaw/Яков Ша
Captain Andrew (Henry, Alexander?) Mowbray/Ондрей Мутр
Poruchik John Wood/Ян Иванов сын, Вуд, landlord in Nizhny Novgorod
Praporshchik William Durie/Вилим Дюри 
Praporshchik David Andrews/Давыд Адворец 
Praporshchik Peter Yuille/Пётр Юль (killed in action)
Ensign George-Yuri Leirmont/Юрья Лермант 
Scribe John Fermor/Ян Фарфар
Drummer Frank Sewell/Франциск Сеуль (wounded).		
Doctor/Орн Бартень	
Andrew Anston/Андрей Ангстон, nobleman			
William Aston/Вилим Иванов сын, Анстон (Янстун), nobleman		
Arthur Armon/Артур Армон, nobleman			
James Auchterlony (Ouchterlony)/Якуб Охторлони, nobleman	
David Buist or Bruce/Давид Бюст, nobleman		
Andrew Henry Wood/Ондрей-Давид Вуд (Вод), nobleman, landlord in Galich		
Alexander Gordon/Александер Гордон		
William Car/Вилим Кар, nobleman	
Robert Kingan/Роборт Кинган, nobleman			
John Crichton/Ян Крихтон, nobleman
Robert Cunningham/Робарт Кумнигем, nobleman, landlord in Nizhny Novgorod	
John Laundie/Ян Лунды Романов, nobleman	
Peter Monteith/Петр Мантет, nobleman
Andrew Moutray/Андрей Марлы, nobleman
Gilbert Mellick/Гиберт Мелех (Меллер), nobleman	
John Mowbrey/Ян Мубр, nobleman				
William Paul/Вилим Паул, nobleman				
Edward Paull/Едварт Андреев сын, Пауль
Robert Stenson/Роборт Стинсон, nobleman (wounded) 	
James Steele/Якуб Стыль, nobleman			
James Scott/Якуб Шкот, nobleman			
James Adamson/Якуб-Ульян Адамсон, Васильев, nobleman
Adam Aikman/Адам Акмон, private 
William Arthur/Вилим Артор, private 
 /Юрий Бах, private 
 /Анц Брандоборк, private 
David Brown/Давыд Иванов сын, Брун, private 
 /Михайло Венглин, private 
John Williamson/Анц Вилимсон, private 
James Drew/Якуб Дреф, private 
John Antzplatov/Иван Анцплатов-Кобылин, landlord in Rostov 
Arthur Antz/Антур-Юрий Анц
James Duff/Якуб Дуф
John Forbes/Ян(Якуб) Томасов сын, Фарбус 
William Harvie/Вилим Гарви-Ганри
William Horne/Вилим Гарвин (with wife in Tula)
John Gents/Ян Ген
Peter (Patrick) Gordon/Петр Гордон
John Gurthrie/Ян Горты, сын Адамов
John Inglis/Ян Ингле(н)т
David Laundie/Давыд Лунды
 /Ян Лян
 /Ян Мудр
 /Симан Клеиншмет
Thomas Clelland/Томас (orthodox name Анофрий) Клилянт (wounded near Mozhaysk) 
William Clelland/Вилим (orthodox name Петр)  Клилянт, landlord in Vologda, since 1627 in Nizhny Novgorod	
George Peebles/Юрья Пиблит
Thomas Philips/Тумас Филипов
 /Александр Рар
David Ruthven/Давыд Ровен (wounded)
William Ruthven/Вилим Ровен-Радван (killed in action)
William Shearer/Вилим Иванов сын, Шеир
Allan Sympson/Алону Сымсон
James Steele/Якуб Стиль
William Steward/Вилим  Стуарт
 /Анц Суцвент (Суцвелт)
 /Давыд Сухвалт
Gabriel Yetts/Гаврил Яц

2nd Platoon
Captain Thomas Wyeast/Томас Юстос
Poruchik Neil O’Donald/Нил Одонол-Одонил
Praporshchik Brian O’Donald/Брин Одонол 
Praporshchik Ian Bain/Ян-Осип Бан
Ensign /Атеган (Отеган) Мартин, nobleman
Scribe /Адрей Баба писарь	
Drummer /Балах Тарлах	
Drummer /Михелт
Drummer /Ян Романов сын Терел-Терех	
 /Ардор Иванов сын, Аганлон, nobleman	 
 /Якуб Акалан, nobleman	
 /Бреян Акан (Окаян), nobleman, landlord in Vologda
 /Ардон Андох, nobleman		
 /Донолт Аферон, nobleman		
Gabriel Bredon/Гаврила Юрьев сын Бреден (Бред)	
Ian Broom/Ян Брун, nobleman, landowner at Alatyr
 /Он Яковлев сын, Грум, nobleman
Ian Duffy/Ян Дуф, nobleman	
 /Томас Ирис, nobleman
 /Варнава Килеварт, nobleman
 /Рыцерт Кумен, nobleman	
Thomas MacCurtain/Тумас Макартол, nobleman
 /Ян Макаф, nobleman
Peter MacNailly/Петр-Павел Макноли, nobleman
Donoaghie Macnamari/Данах Макнамори (Мангармов), nobleman
Ian MacToole/Ян Мактуль, nobleman
 /Кал Рели, nobleman	
Ian Row/Ян Ро, nobleman
 /Юрий Фишгарец, nobleman
Alexander Ardson/Александр cын Иванов, Ард(ов), private
John Arnott/Ян cын Борисов, Арн(от), private
 /Брин Артан, private
 /Бриен Асирдон, private
 /Ян Ахи, private
 /David Bell/Давыд Бели, private
Michael Bourke/Михель Бурк 
 /Вилим Врим, private	
 /Томас Вяст(Васт), private	
Richard Cax-Cox/Кирилл-Роман Куй, Кондратьев
Alexander Gar/Александр Гарь
 /Ян Гети, private		
 /Арт Донахи, private	
 /Ляхлин Доск, private	
 /Ян Дюри ирл, private	
 /Михаил Камен, private	
William Carroll/Вилим Карил, private
Ian Cook/Ян Кук, private
 /Рицерт Линс, private	
Art MacMahon/Арт Макмагони, private
Conagher MacKeen/Конохор Макине, private
 /Торлах Магдермонт (Магин), private 	
Arthur MacGinn/Арт-Ермоген Магин 
James MacAllen/Якуб Маканал 
Donoaghie MacKinley/Данах Макноли-Макнали	
Conagher MacKeen/Конохор Макине
Michail Kriush/Михаль(orthodox name Maxim) Михайлов Круг
Art MacKeen/Арт Магин, landlord in Vologda
Thomas MacCurtain/Василий-Корнила, Мартынов
Donoaghie O'Cahane/Донах Окаян-Окоян 
Ian O'Collins/Ян Околон (Orlov/Орлов)
 /Доноль Маклукаш, private 
 /Донолт Моклан, private 
Ian O'Kelly/Ян Окели, private 
Arthur O'Hanlon/Рури Одонол, private 
 /Обонак Роборт, private 
 /Обрин Калах, private 
/Околон Ян, private 
Niall O’Mara/Нел Омори-Мори, private 
 /Смет Ян, private 
Brian O’Sirdan/, private 
 /Рицерт Ускисен (Федор Устриков), private
Jarlath Scrope/Скруп Джан, private 
Ian Parekh/Ян Парах, private 
George Peebles/Юрий Пиблиз, private
Alexander Ward/, private 
Andrew Wood/Андрей Вуд, private

Scottish captain-Rittmeister Antz Op/Анц Оп and Irish Captain Siman Biy/Симан Бий

Assimilation in Russia
In late 1610, many former members of the Swedish-Russian army participated in the Polish capture of the Russian border town of Belaia and newly served Belaia garrison composed of approximately 150 soldiers organized in two cavalry companies, one Scottish and one Irish. Those companies served side by side for three years while maintaining their separate identities and strong unit cohesion. Some of the men married local women and started families. After 1616 part of them had been sent to Tula, a major southern military headquarters, where they helped defend Russia's vulnerable steppe frontier against Tatar raids.

While living in the Tula region several officers of the former Belaia garrison, including George-Yuri Leirmont, petitioned Tsar Mikhail for an increase in status and salary. They requested transfer into the ranks of the Russian gentry militia called "pomeshchiks". That would qualify each of them to receive several hundred acres of land with servs. In their petition, the men stated: "We your slaves do not wish to go to our own land, because we have married here and have children, and we want to spill our blood for Thee the Sovereign."
After a review of their condition, the Russians dismissed twenty one of them as unfit for further duty due to old age or infirmities; those men were honourably settled near Tula at half pay. About a dozen Scottish and Irish soldiers successfully petitioned the tsar to allow them to return home.

See also
Thirty Years' War
Scottish Russians

Notes

References

  "Георг Андреев Лермонтов, родоначальник русской ветви Лермонтовых", Москва, 1894

1610s in Russia
1620s in Russia
Highland regiments
Infantry regiments
Thirty Years' War
Warfare of the Early Modern period